Soviet Literature which is also known as Sovetskaya Literatura was a Moscow-based literary magazine, dedicated to disseminating the literature of the Soviet Union, including Russia and its satellite states. The magazine was first published in 1946. It was published on a monthly basis by the Union of Soviet Writers, in several languages including English, French, German, Spanish, Hungarian, Polish, Czech, and Slovak. Earlier incarnations of the magazine in the 1930s and 1940s were titled Literature of the World Revolution and International Literature. Having been renamed in 1946, it ran continuously until 1990, when publication ended with the dissolution of the USSR.

For many years, the editor-in-chief was Savva Dangulov. The last editor-in-chief was Natasha Perova. After the closure of Soviet Literature in 1990, Perova started the magazine Glas in January 1991.

References

Defunct magazines published in Russia
Literary magazines published in the Soviet Union
Magazines established in 1946
Magazines disestablished in 1990
Magazines published in Moscow
Monthly magazines published in Russia
Multilingual magazines